John Lundvik (born 27 January 1983) is a Swedish singer, songwriter, and former sprinter. He was part of the athletic team for IFK Växjö. Lundvik also has a singing and songwriter career having composed songs for films and the Wedding of Victoria, Crown Princess of Sweden, and Daniel Westling in 2010.

In 2018, he competed in Melodifestivalen with his song "My Turn", finishing in 3rd place. He represented Sweden in Eurovision Song Contest 2019 with "Too Late for Love" finishing fifth. In the same contest he represented the United Kingdom as one of the songwriters for the song "Bigger Than Us" performed by Michael Rice, which finished last in the grand final.

Early life 
Lundvik was born in London, and was adopted by Swedish expatriates in the UK when he was one week old. He lived in London until the age of six when his family returned to Sweden, settling in Växjö. He has never met his biological parents.

Athletics 
Lundvik was an avid sportsman. He won many medals including gold at youth and junior level and participated in the Youth Finns Campaign 2001. In 2005, Lundvik was a member of the 4 × 100 metres relay team for IFK Växjö, which earned a bronze medal at the 2005 Swedish Championships.

Personal bests 
60 metres: 6.99 seconds (Växjö, 3 February 2002)
100 metres: 10.84 seconds (Karlskrona, 12 June 2006)
200 metres: 22.42 seconds (Vellinge, 17 August 2003)

Musical career

2010–2018: Songwriting and Melodifestivalen 2018 

Lundvik started his musical career in 2010, composing the song "When You Tell the World You're Mine" for the wedding of Victoria, Crown Princess of Sweden, and Daniel Westling. Lundvik went on to compose music for musicians such as Anton Ewald, Isac Elliot, and Sanna Nielsen, in addition to composing music for the film Easy Money. He has also composed music for the American TV series Empire.

In 2016, Lundvik wrote and performed "All About the Games", the Swedish song for the Olympic Games in Rio de Janeiro. In 2016, he also took part in Allsång på Skansen, performing a duet with Lill Lindfors. In 2018, Lundvik took part in Melodifestivalen with the song "My Turn", in a bid to represent Sweden in Eurovision Song Contest 2018. He qualified from the first semi-final directly to the finals, and finished third overall.

2019–present: Eurovision Song Contest 

He participated in Melodifestivalen 2019 with the song "Too Late for Love", where he advanced directly to the final. The song reached number one on the Sverigetopplistan singles chart in March 2019. It eventually won Melodifestivalen, represented Sweden at the Eurovision Song Contest 2019 in Tel Aviv, Israel in the second semi-final. The song qualified for the final and finished fifth overall with 334 points.

Concurrently, he composed "Bigger Than Us", the winning song in the UK selection, and the version sung by Michael Rice was selected to represent the United Kingdom in Eurovision 2019. It finished last in the final.

On 16 February 2020, it was announced that Lundvik was one of the songwriters that composed "Mon alliée (The Best in Me)", the French entry for the Eurovision Song Contest 2020.

He participated in Melodifestivalen 2022 with the song "Änglavakt". He performed on 12 February 2022 in the first round and finished second, qualifying directly to the final. He performed at the final on 12 March 2022 and finished in eighth place with 60 points.

Other appearances 
In 2020, Lundvik participated as a celebrity dancer in the fifteenth season of the Swedish dancing show Let's Dance and won the competition, beating Sussie Eriksson in the final.

Discography

Extended plays

Singles

As lead artist

As featured artist

Compositions

References

External links 

1983 births
British emigrants to Sweden
Living people
Swedish male sprinters
Swedish pop singers
Swedish songwriters
Swedish soul singers
Musicians from London
People from Växjö
21st-century Swedish singers
21st-century Swedish male singers
Swedish adoptees
Eurovision Song Contest entrants for Sweden
Eurovision Song Contest entrants of 2019
Swedish people of African descent
English-language singers from Sweden
Melodifestivalen contestants of 2022
Melodifestivalen contestants of 2019
Melodifestivalen contestants of 2018